The following is a list of players of the now-defunct Providence Steamrollers professional basketball team.

Hank Beenders
Bob Brown
Tom Callahan
Ernie Calverley
Armand Cure
Red Dehnert
Bill Downey
Johnny Ezersky
Dick Fitzgerald
Pop Goodwin
Wyndol Gray
George Grimshaw
Chick Halbert
Nat Hickey
Bob Hubbard
John Janisch
Ken Keller
Jerry Kelly
Dino Martin
Ariel Maughan
George Mearns
Carl Meinhold
Elmore Morgenthaler
George Nostrand
Buddy O'Grady
Fred Paine
George Pastushok
Les Pugh
Mel Riebe
Lee Robbins
Hank Rosenstein
Giff Roux
Ken Sailors
Ben Scharnus
Otto Schnellbacher
Earl Shannon
Howie Shannon
Bob Shea
Lou Spicer
Mel Thurston
Andy Tonkovich
Jack Toomay
Brady Walker
Jake Weber
Ray Wertis

References
Providence Steamrollers all-time roster @ basketball-reference.com

National Basketball Association all-time rosters
 
Providence Steamrollers players